The NES Four Score is a multitap accessory created by Nintendo in 1990 for the Nintendo Entertainment System. Select games can utilize it to enable up to four-player gameplay. The NES Four Score is similar to the previously introduced NES Satellite, a device that allows four players to connect to the NES and extends the range using infrared wireless communication.

Prior to the advent of multitap support on NES, the NES games which support more than two players, require the players to pair up and then alternate turns while sharing the same pair of NES controllers. Some games that originally feature support for more than two players, such as some arcade games, support only two simultaneous players in their NES versions.

The NES Four Score plugs into both controller ports on the NES console and allows input of up to four NES controllers. On the NES Four Score, there is an option to switch between two-player and four-player modes, and there are turbo A and B buttons that give any of the connected controllers a rapid-fire boost. The NES Four Score can also be used as a controller extension cable because the wire which leads from the accessory to the NES is several feet in length.

Games 
These licensed games are compatible with the NES Four Score, for more than two concurrent players:

 Bomberman II (3-players)
 Championship Bowling
 Danny Sullivan's Indy Heat
 Exploding Fist (unreleased)
 Gauntlet II
 Greg Norman's Golf Power
 Harlem Globetrotters
 Kings of the Beach
 Magic Johnson's Fast Break 
 Monopoly
 Monster Truck Rally
 M.U.L.E.
 NES Play Action Football
 A Nightmare on Elm Street
 Nintendo World Cup 
 R.C. Pro-Am II
 Rackets & Rivals
 Rock 'n Ball
 Roundball: 2 on 2 Challenge
 Spot: The Video Game
 Smash TV (two players with two controllers each)
 Super Off Road
 Super Jeopardy!
 Super Spike V'Ball
 Swords and Serpents
 Top Players' Tennis

These homebrew games are also compatible:

Justice Duel
Micro Mages

4-Players Adaptor
The  is a licensed peripheral released for the Famicom in Japan by Hori.  It is the Famicom's equivalent to the NES Four Score.  Its purpose is to allow up to four players to play simultaneously in compatible games by allowing for additional controllers to be connected through the console's expansion port. The adapter also features a switch that allows the first two players to use external controllers in lieu of the standard Famicom controllers, giving each player the choice to use an external controller. Many of the titles in Technōs Japan's Kunio-kun series support the adapter.

Games
 Bible Buffet
Downtown Nekketsu Kōshinkyoku: Soreyuke Daiundōkai
Ike Ike! Nekketsu Hockey Bu: Subette Koronde Dai Rantō
Kunio-kun no Nekketsu Soccer League
Moero TwinBee: Cinnamon-hakase o Sukue! (3-players)
Nekketsu Kakutō Densetsu
Nintendo World Cup
Nekketsu Kōkō Dodge Ball Bu 
Nekketsu Street Basket: Ganbare Dunk Heroes
Spot: The Video Game
Super Spike V'ball
U.S. Championship V'Ball
Wit's

Non-compatible games 

The following games are notable as having three or more variously alternating or simultaneous players despite not making use of the NES Four Score or NES Satellite. Some are also expected to have three or more simultaneous players because of the existence of the Four Score option coupled with the facts of being released after the Four Score's availability, and one or more of versions of the game for other systems had this feature (i.e. not using the Four Score for four-player games published later seems irrational).

 Anticipation
 Battletoads & Double Dragon: The Ultimate Team
 Contra Force
 Jeopardy!
 Jeopardy! Junior Edition
 Jeopardy! 25th Silver Anniversary Edition
 Micro Machines
 Nobunaga's Ambition
 Nobunaga's Ambition II
 Teenage Mutant Ninja Turtles II: The Arcade Game
 Teenage Mutant Ninja Turtles III: The Manhattan Project

Notes

References

See also
NES Satellite
Multitap
List of Nintendo Entertainment System accessories

Nintendo Entertainment System accessories
Computer-related introductions in 1990
de:NES Four Score